Shaun Teasdale (born 8 November 1932) is a New Zealand male compound archer and part of the national team. The left handed archer has participated in the individual event and the 2015 World Archery Championships in Copenhagen. He has won a gold medal in the individual event at Shanghai World Cup 2010.

References

1988 births
Living people
New Zealand male archers
Place of birth missing (living people)
Archers at the 2010 Commonwealth Games
Commonwealth Games competitors for New Zealand